, the Rosner's hairstreak, is a butterfly of the family . It is found in western North America in British Columbia. and Washington state. Subspecies  is known as Barry's hairstreak.

The larvae of subspecies M. r. rosneri feed on western red cedar (Thuja plicata), while the larvae of subspecies M. r. plicataria feed on Rocky Mountain juniper (Juniperus scopulorum).

Subspecies
 Rosner's hairstreak (interior ranges of British Columbia)
  Barry's hairstreak (Vancouver Island and Coast Range of British Columbia, Washington)

Taxonomy

References

External links
 , Butterflies and Moths of North America

Butterflies described in 1976
Callophrys